Mehmed Cemil Bey (1828 – 1872) was an Ottoman diplomat, who was one of the many European-educated public figures in the mid-19th-century Ottoman Empire. 

He represented the Ottoman Empire at the Congress of Paris, the 1856 diplomatic meeting held to make peace after the Crimean War.

Early life and career
Mehmed Cemil Bey was born in Constantinople as the son of Mustafa Reşid Pasha, the chief architect behind the Tanzimat reforms.

He was a representative of the Ottoman Empire, alongside Mehmed Emin Âli Pasha at the Congress of Paris in 1856. He also served as an ambassador to France.

References

19th-century diplomats
1828 births
1872 deaths
Ambassadors of the Ottoman Empire to France